Hitcher in the Dark is a 1989 psychological thriller directed by Italian director Umberto Lenzi.

Plot 
Mark Glazer is a mentally disturbed young man, who has a sexual obsession for his dead mother. He drives around in his father's RV in order to pick up female hitchhikers to kidnap, assault, and murder so he can fulfill his sexual desires. One of the women he picks up is protagonist Daniela, who, unfortunately for her, strongly resembles his mother, and she is about to take her life's ride.

Cast 
 Joe Balogh as Mark Glazer
 Josie Bissett as Daniela Foster
 Jason Saucier as Kevin
 Robin Fox as Mark's Father

Production
Hitcher in the Dark was made by Umberto Lenzi for Filmirage for crediting him as Humphrey Humbert on Ghosthouse. Lenzi claimed the film was influenced by The Collector while stating later concluding was disappointed with the film the ending of the film had to be changed.

Release and reception
Hitcher in the Dark was first released in 1989. In GoreZone, Loris Curci states that "despite its well-crafted psychological thriller in the style of Lenzi's giallo shockers."

References

Sources

External links
 

1989 films
Giallo films
Italian psychological thriller films
1980s psychological thriller films
Films set in the United States
Films about hitchhiking
Films scored by Carlo Maria Cordio
1980s English-language films